Leonardo Carol Madelón (born 25 January 1963) is an Argentine football manager and former player who played as a midfielder. He is the current manager of Central Córdoba de Santiago del Estero.

Career

Madelón played club football for San Lorenzo, Unión de Santa Fe and Rosario Central between 1982 and 1993.

Coaching career
In 1997, he started his managerial career with Colegiales in the lower leagues of Argentine football. He then had a spell with El Porvenir before returning to his former club Unión de Santa Fe in 2001.

He then had an unsuccessful spell in charge of Nueva Chicago in 2004. He returned to management in 2006, and lead Olimpo to both Apertura and Clausura championships in the Primera B Nacional (second division) 2006–07 season, gaining automatic promotion to the Primera División.

In 2007, he returned to his former club Rosario Central, and in 2008 he took over as manager of  Gimnasia y Esgrima La Plata. On 2 December 2009, the coach has quit Gimnasia and was replaced by Pablo Fernández. In 2010, Madelón coached Rosario Central again, but could not help the team avoid relegation.

For the 2010 Apertura, Madelón replaced Hugo Tocalli as Quilmes manager.

Managerial titles

References

External links
  
 Managerial statistics in the Argentine Primera at Fútbol XXI 

1963 births
Living people
People from General López Department
Argentine footballers
Association football midfielders
San Lorenzo de Almagro footballers
Unión de Santa Fe footballers
Rosario Central footballers
Argentine Primera División players
Argentine football managers
Unión de Santa Fe managers
Nueva Chicago managers
Talleres de Córdoba managers
Olimpo managers
Rosario Central managers
Club de Gimnasia y Esgrima La Plata managers
Club Atlético Platense managers
Arsenal de Sarandí managers
Central Córdoba de Santiago del Estero managers
Sportspeople from Santa Fe Province